Gentherm Incorporated, formerly called Amerigon, is an American thermal management technologies company. Gentherm created the first thermoelectrically heated and cooled seat system for the automotive industry. Called the "Climate Control Seat" system, it was first adopted by the Ford Motor Company and introduced as an option on the model year 2000 Lincoln Navigator in 1999. Today it is available on more than 50 vehicles sold by Ford, General Motors, Toyota (Lexus), Kia, Hyundai, Nissan (Infinity), Range Rover and Jaguar Land Rover.

The company today is a developer and marketer of thermal management technologies for heating and cooling and temperature control devices for a variety of industries.

Gentherm is publicly traded on Nasdaq under the symbol THRM and is headquartered in Northville, MI. Gentherm's thermoelectric technologies are based on the Peltier Effect, the 1834 discovery that passing an electric current through a sandwich of two dissimilar metals will make them hot on one side and cold (the lack of heat) on the other.

Since 2005, Gentherm has been partnering with BMW and Ford on a project that is backed by the U.S. Department of Energy focused on the development of an automotive thermoelectric generator (ATEG) that converts waste exhaust heat into electrical power based on the Seebeck Effect. A prototype of the ATEG was named one of the most promising innovations for 2012 by Car and Driver magazine.

In December 2014 the company announced that it will open a new automotive plant in Prilep, North Macedonia and that will employ 1,000 people. This is Gentherm's first facility in Macedonia.

Gentherm has 20+ locations in the following countries: Canada, China, Germany, Hungary, Japan, Malta, Mexico, North Macedonia, South Korea, Ukraine, United Kingdom, United States and Vietnam.

References

External links 
 
Careers at Gentherm

Energy harvesting
Heating, ventilation, and air conditioning
Energy conversion
Companies based in Michigan
Companies based in Metro Detroit
Auto parts suppliers of the United States